Part of Me Remix EP (also listed as Part of Me (Remix EP) in iTunes) is a digital released EP by American rock musician Chris Cornell, released on May 26, 2009. The album features four electronic pop remixes of Cornell's fifth and most recent single "Part of Me", released from his R&B/pop album Scream.

Remixes are provided by California based electro house DJ Steve Aoki, group LMFAO, electronica production team L.A. Riots and DJ Kleerup.

Track listing

References

Chris Cornell albums
2009 EPs
Remix EPs
2009 remix albums
Interscope Records EPs
Interscope Records remix albums
Electropop remix albums